Kadawunu Poronduwa (Sinhala: කඩවුනු පොරොන්දුව, "The Broken Promise") was the first film to be made in the Sinhala language; it is generally considered to have heralded the coming of Sinhala Cinema. The film was produced and filmed in India however, and was highly influenced by South Indian melodrama. It was first shown on January 21, 1947 at the Kingsley Cinema in Colombo, Sri Lanka.

A remake was released in 1982.

Plot 

Ralahamy, a member of high status, dies leaving his family in debt after having squandered his fortune through extensive drinking and other vices. To get back into wealth, Ralahamy's wife Tackla pushes her daughter Ranjani to marry a wealthy older man Victor with a child through an earlier marriage. In this process, Samson, Ranjani's boyfriend, who had tried extensively to get the family back into good graces going so far as to pay off their debts, is spurned. He then goes abroad to win a fortune.

When Samson returns he learns of Ranjani's engagement to Victor and tries to reach her through letter. His letters are hidden from her however, and rumours spread that Samson is now a cripple. Ultimately the truth is revealed.

Cast 
Rukmani Devi as Ranjani: A high-class girl who is pushed into a marriage with an older man and forced to reject her boyfriend.
Gemini Kantha as Jossie: village woman; love interest of Manappuwa
Rupa Devi as Tackla: Ranjani's mother
Miriam Jayamanne as Hilda
Eddie Jayamanne as Manappuwa: naive village simpleton; comic relief
B. A. W. Jayamanne as Samson: Ranjani's love interest; wants financial success for her family but is spurned by the mother
Peter Peries as Victor: old wealthy man with whom Ranjani is forcibly engaged
Stanley Mallawarachchi as Hemapala
D. T. Perera as Jayasena
Asilyn Balasooriya as Sumana
J. B. Perera as Harmahana
Hugo Fernando as doctor
Suriya Rani as Aaya
Sina Pishpani as Narsi
Wida Soyza
S. S. Ponnisena

Production 
Kadawunu Poronduwa was produced by S. M. Nayagam, a pioneer of Sinhala film industry and an Indian citizen. He had to ferry the entire cast to Madurai India for filming and production. It began as a successful play for dramatist B. A. W. Jayamanne. In 1947 he filmed and processed the movie in South India.

Kadawunu Poronduwa produced a formula that Sinhala films would follow up through the 1960s; Jayamanne describes the formula as such:

Songs

"Sri Jaya Vijaya" – Minerva Singing Group
"Prema Daya" – Rukmani Devi
"Lapati Rupe Age" – Eddie Jayamanne (the original gramophone record label was incorrectly printed as "Eddie jayanamme and Jemini Kantha")
"Deva Swarmi" – Rukmani Devi
"Sandyawe Sriya Ramya Lesa Pena" – Rukmani Devi and Hugo Fernando - for film  /  Rukmani Devi and Stanley Mallawarachchi - for gramophone record only
"Is Issara Welaa" – Eddie Jayamanne and Jemini Kantha
"Mage Saka Bambarea" – Eddie Jayamanne and Jemini Kantha
"Thakkita Tharikita" – Eddie Jayamanne and Jemini Kantha
"Jevithaye Saamey" – Rukmani Devi
"Yaami Indiya Desataa" – Rukmani Devi
"Sundari Rupa Rajini" – Stanley Mallawarachchi and Peter Peries
"Papi Shayapi Do" – Rukmani Devi and Hugo Fernando / Stanley Mallawarachchi

Songs of Kadawunu Poronduwa were issued by Parlophone gramophone records with the film release in 1947. They were the last records issued by the Palophone label in Sri Lanka.

Please note that the last two songs listed above were not issued on gramophone records and now it is difficult to find them.

See also
List of Sri Lankan films

References

External links
Sri Lanka Cinema Database
National Film Corporation of Sri Lanka - Official Website

1947 films
1947 drama films
Films set in British Ceylon
Sri Lankan drama films
Sri Lankan black-and-white films